Love Oh Love is the debut solo album by Leroy Hutson, who had been the lead singer of The Impressions after he replaced former lead singer Curtis Mayfield, who left the group to embark on his own solo recording career in 1970. The photography was by Joel Brodsky. The album was the first release by Hutson on Mayfield's Curtom record label.

Track listing
All tracks composed by Leroy Hutson; except where indicated
"So In Love With You" (Leroy Hutson, Michael Hawkins) 2:57	 	
"Love, Oh Love" (Janice Hutson, Leroy Hutson, Michael Hawkins)	3:52 	 
"When You Smile" (Joe Reaves, Leroy Hutson, Maurice Commander)	4:18	
"Getting it On" (Instrumental - Theme from The Jay Johnson Affair)	3:55 	
"Time Brings On A Change" 4:39 	
"I'll Be There, I'll Still Care" (Leroy Hutson, Michael Hawkins) 3:06 	
"I'm In Love With You, Girl" 2:40
"As Long As There's Love Around" 3:11

Personnel
Leroy Hutson - lead vocals, arrangements, percussion, synthesizer (ARP), electric piano
Morris Beeks - organ
Sol Bobrov - strings leader
Joel Brandon - flute
Victor Chandler - bass
Aaron Dodd - tuba
Michael Harris - trumpet
Scotty Harris - drums
Stephen Harris - lead guitar
Billy Howell - trombone
The Imaginations, The Identicals, Janice Hutson - background vocals
Bill McFarland - trombone
Miller Pertum - vibraphone
Joe Reaves - percussion
Sonny Seals - tenor saxophone
Norman Shobey - congas
Rich Tufo   - string arrangements
Tom Washington - arranger
Jerry Wilson - alto saxophone

Charts

Singles

References

External links 
 Leroy Hutson - Love Oh Love LP at Discogs

1973 debut albums
Leroy Hutson albums
Curtom Records albums
Albums with cover art by Joel Brodsky